Durvillaea willana is a large species of southern bull kelp endemic to New Zealand.

Etymology
The species epithet, willana, honours Eileen Alice Willa who collected many algal species for Lindauer.

Description
This species is chocolate brown in colour and is darker than all other bull kelp species. It has a branched stipe. The species is non-buoyant and does not have 'honeycomb' in its fronds. The holdfast becomes large and spreads like a plate on rocky substrates.

This species is superficially similar in appearance to Durvillaea antarctica. However, D. willana has smaller blades than D. antarctica and is usually found lower on the shoreline because its lower tolerance of wave action comparded D. antarctica. It also has a branched stipe and does not have buoyant fronds, unlike D. antarctica.

Distribution
This species of kelp is endemic to New Zealand and is found on the southeastern shores of the North Island, although not in Cook Strait, as well as on the shores of the South Island and Stewart Island.

Gaps in the geographic range of the species may have been caused by earthquake uplift events such as the 1855 Wairarapa earthquake. However, historic uplift (800 - 1400 years before present) in the Akatore fault zone does not seem to have caused any long term disruption in the genetic diversity of D. willana, in that region. This result suggests that the subtidal D. willana may not die-off completely due to earthquake uplift events.

References

External links
 Algaebase: Durvillaea Lindauer
 Museum of New Zealand Te Papa Tongarewa: Durvillaea willana Lindauer (Species)

Fucales
Flora of New Zealand